Tokyo Metropolitan Government Musashimurayama East High School (東京都立武蔵村山東高等学校 Tōkyō Toritsu Musashimurayama Higashi Kōtōgakkō) was a high school in Musashimurayama, Tokyo, Japan.

Musashimurayama East, founded in 1977 by the Tokyo Metropolitan Government Board of Education, closed in 2004 due to the decrease of students within the area.

In 1994, Masanori Hirasawa, a teacher at the school, found an asteroid orbiting between Mars and Jupiter (1994WQ12) and named it 7892 Musamurahigashi, after the school name.

See also

Former high schools in Tokyo
Educational institutions established in 1977
Educational institutions disestablished in 2004
1977 establishments in Japan
Musashimurayama, Tokyo